Lew Stansby (born 1940) is an American bridge player from Dublin, California. Lew, a former commodities trader lives with wife and fellow national champion JoAnna Stansby. Since his first national win in the Reisinger in 1965, he has won over 35 national championships and seven world championships, accumulating a win in every decade since 1965.

Stansby was inducted into the ACBL Hall of Fame in 2001.

Bridge accomplishments

Honors

 ACBL Hall of Fame, 2001

Awards

 Fishbein Trophy (1) 2000
 Herman Trophy (1) 2007
 Mott-Smith Trophy (2) 1984, 1986

Wins

 Bermuda Bowl (3) 1985, 1987, 2001 
 d'Orsi Senior Bowl (2) 2005, 2007 
 Rosenblum Cup (1) 1994 
 World Open Pairs Championship (1) 1982
 North American Bridge Championships (35)
 Silodor Open Pairs (1) 1986 
 Nail Life Master Open Pairs (1) 1998 
 North American Pairs (1) 2002 
 Freeman Mixed Board-a-Match (1) 2010 
 Grand National Teams (7) 1982, 1983, 1985, 1987, 1993, 1996, 2003 
 Roth Open Swiss Teams (2) 2010, 2013 
 Vanderbilt (7) 1967, 1984, 1987, 1994, 1996, 1998, 2011 
 Senior Knockout Teams (1) 2013 
 Mitchell Board-a-Match Teams (4) 1995, 2001, 2005, 2007 
 Chicago Mixed Board-a-Match (2) 2001, 2008 
 Reisinger (5) 1965, 1981, 1985, 1986, 1996 
 Spingold (3) 1975, 1990, 2000

Runners-up

 Bermuda Bowl (1) 1989 
 Rosenblum Cup (1) 1982 
 North American Bridge Championships (24)
 Wernher Open Pairs (1) 1991 
 Blue Ribbon Pairs (1) 1981 
 Nail Life Master Open Pairs (1) 1999 
 North American Pairs (1) 1997 
 Grand National Teams (3) 2000, 2001, 2006 
 Jacoby Open Swiss Teams (1) 2000 
 Vanderbilt (3) 1992, 2006, 2010 
 Senior Knockout Teams (1) 2012 
 Mitchell Board-a-Match Teams (3) 1989, 1994, 2008 
 Chicago Mixed Board-a-Match (1) 2004 
 Reisinger (4) 1983, 2006, 2007, 2012 
 Spingold (4) 1992, 1993, 1995, 2003

References

External links
 
 

1940 births
American contract bridge players
Bermuda Bowl players
People from Castro Valley, California
Living people
Date of birth missing (living people)
Place of birth missing (living people)